Shobana Chandrakumar Pillai (born 21 March 1970) is an Indian actress and Bharatanatyam dancer. She acts predominantly in Malayalam films along with Telugu and Tamil films with a few Hindi, Kannada and English films. She has won two National Film Awards, one Kerala State Film Awards, two Filmfare Awards South, with 14 Nominations for Best Actress Category in three different south Indian languages, Tamil Nadu State's Kalaimamani Award in 2011 and numerous other awards.

She won the National Film Award for Best Actress twice, for her performances in the Malayalam film Manichitrathazhu (1993) and the English film Mitr, My Friend (2001). Subsequent to the year 1999, Shobana turned extremely selective about her films.

Shobana was trained under the Bharatanatyam dancers Chitra Visweswaran and Padma Subrahmanyam. She emerged as an independent performer and choreographer in her twenties and currently runs a dance school, Kalarpana, in Chennai. In 2006, the Government of India honoured her with the Padma Shri for her contributions towards the arts.

In 2014, the Kerala State Government honoured her with the Kala Ratna Award. In 2019, she was bestowed an honorary doctorate from Dr. M.G.R. Educational and Research Institute. In 2022, she was bestowed a Doctor of Letters degree from Sree Sankaracharya University of Sanskrit.

Personal life
She is the niece of the Travancore sisters – Lalitha, Padmini and Ragini, all of whom were Indian classical dancers and actresses. 

Shobhana is single. In 2011, she became a single-parent mother to a girl child named Anantha Narayani Chandrakumar through adoption.

Career

Film career
Shobana made her debut as a child artist. She had a major role in the Tamil movie Mangala Nayagi in 1980 directed by Krishnan–Panju, starring Srikanth and K. R. Vijaya, which was the remake of the Hindi film Saajan Bina Suhagan, for which she won the Best Child Artiste Award.

She also starred in the Telugu film Bhakta Dhruva Markendaya in 1982, an acclaimed all children film made in both Tamil and Telugu. As an adult, she was introduced to the film industry through the Malayalam film April 18, by director Balachandra Menon. Her realistic portrayal of a simple girl-next-door appealed to audiences and she went on to work in numerous films. In the same year, she entered the Tamil film industry and acted in Enakkul Oruvan, directed by SP Muthuraman. Enakkul Oruvan didn't perform well at the box office and Shobana's commercial landing was stalled as she went back into Malayalam films. She did come back to act in occasional Tamil films opposite Satyaraj (Mallu Vetti Minor, Vaathiyar Veetu Pillai), Bhagyaraj (Ithu Namma Aalu) and Vijayakanth (Ponmana Selvan, En Kitta Mothathey) in the early 90s – these roles were generally glamorous in which Shobana generally acted as the beautiful, posh and haughty city girl who is eventually charmed by the village boy.

Her other major films include Rudraveena (1988), Meleparambil Aanveedu, Kanamarayathu, Ithiri Poove Chuvanna Poove, Yathra(1985), Anantaram, Nadodikkattu (1987), Vellanakalude Nadu (1988), Idhu Namma Aalu (1988), Siva (1989), Innale (1990), Kalikkalam (1990), Thalapathi (1991), Pappayude Swantham Appoos (1992), Manichitrathazhu (1993), Thenmavin Kombath (1994), Minnaram (1994), Mazhayethum Munpe (1995),  Hitler (1996),Agni Sakshi (1999), Dance like a Man (2003), Makalkku (2005), Thira (2013) and Varane Avashyamund (2020). From Aviduthe Pole Ivideyum to Upaharam, Shobana did sixteen movies in a single year, 1985. Shobana also acted in the Tamil period film Kochadaiiyaan.

Shobana won her first National Film Award for Best Actress in 1993 for her performance in AM Fazil's Manichitrathazhu. Her portrayal of Ganga Nakulan and alter-ego Nagavalli in the film was described by critics as "spell binding". She received her second National Film Award for Best Actress in 2001 for her role in the Indian English language film Mitr, My Friend, directed by Revathi.  Consequent to the 1993 National Award, Shobana turned extremely selective about her films.

Classical dance career
Shobana is a Bharata Natyam dancer. She did her dance training at the Chidambaram academy in Chennai, Tamil Nadu under Chitra Visweswaran. Shobana danced  Abhinaya, a pivotal element in Bharata Natyam. She was one among the judges in Jodi No. 1, a reality show for dance aired on Vijay TV.

She started her own dance school, "Kalipinya" in 1989 and got it registered in 1992.

She has worked on collaborative ventures with the likes of tabla maestro Zakir Hussain, Vikku Vinayakram and Mandolin Srinivas. Her recitals abroad include those at the World Malayalee convention, in the United States in 1985 and 1995, in Kuala Lumpur before the King and Queen of Malaysia, numerous cities in the United States, Europe, South East Asia and Australia. Shobana started performing in the Soorya Music & Dance festival organised by Soorya Krishnamoorthy from the year 1994. 

In 1994, Shobana founded a school for classical dance Bharata Natyam in Chennai named Kalarpana.

Filmography

Malayalam

Telugu

Tamil

Kannada

Hindi

English

Awards and recognitions

Titles and honours

Other awards

Television

References

External links
 
 
 

1970 births
Living people
Indian film actresses
Actresses from Thiruvananthapuram
Actresses in Tamil cinema
Actresses in Telugu cinema
Actresses in Malayalam cinema
Performers of Indian classical dance
Bharatanatyam exponents
Kerala State Film Award winners
Filmfare Awards South winners
Best Actress National Film Award winners
Recipients of the Padma Shri in arts
20th-century Indian dancers
21st-century Indian dancers
20th-century Indian actresses
21st-century Indian actresses
Dancers from Kerala
20th-century Indian women artists
21st-century Indian women artists
Indian female classical dancers
Indian women choreographers
Indian choreographers
Indian women classical musicians
Women artists from Kerala
21st-century women musicians
21st-century drummers
Actresses in Tamil television
Actresses in Kannada cinema
Actresses in Hindi cinema
Recipients of the Kerala Sangeetha Nataka Akademi Fellowship